Pisat may refer to:
 Pisat (Thai folklore), a type of ghost in Thai culture
 PISat, and Indian satellite

See also 
 Pisaj, a Thai film